Portmarnock is a coastal suburban settlement in Fingal, Ireland, with significant beaches, a modest commercial core and inland residential estates, and two golf courses, including one of Ireland's best-known golf clubs. , the population was 9,466, an increase on the Census 2011 figure of 9,285.

Portmarnock is also a civil parish in the ancient barony of Coolock in the historic County Dublin.

Location
Portmarnock lies on the coast between Malahide and Baldoyle. Portmarnock could also be said to border, at sea, Sutton and perhaps Howth in the form of Ireland's Eye. Its major beach, the Velvet Strand, is monitored by a lifeguard during the summer season from early April to the start of October.

Velvet Strand, Portmarnock beach

Adjacent to Portmarnock is a narrow beach which extends onto a sandy peninsula with beaches on all sides. Portmarnock's beach is nicknamed the Velvet Strand due to the smooth sand along the beach, and is popular with wind- and kite-surfers.

The beach was the starting point for two important pioneering flights. On 23 June 1930 Australian aviator Charles Kingsford Smith and his crew took off in the Southern Cross on the second westbound transatlantic flight (to Newfoundland), after which they continued on to Oakland, California, completing a circumnavigation of the world. The first solo westbound transatlantic flight began from Portmarnock beach when Jim Mollison, a British pilot, took off in a de Havilland Puss Moth on 18 August 1932 bound for Pennfield Ridge, New Brunswick, Canada.

The sculpture Eccentric Orbit (by Rachel Joynt and Remco de Fouw, erected 2002) on the seafront is of limestone, bronze and stainless steel. The needle points to the North Star, an age-old navigation point. The sculpture commemorates the epic flights of the Southern Cross (the second non-stop east–west North Atlantic flight, in 1930), the Heart's Content (the first east–west non-stop solo North Atlantic flight, 1932) and the abandoned solo North-Atlantic flight of Faith in Australia (1933).

Portmarnock is home to one of the 29 Napoleonic Martello Towers in the Greater Dublin Area.

Etymology and history
The district's name derives from the Irish word port – meaning "port" – and Saint Marnoch or Mernoc, said to have arrived in what is now Portmarnock in the fifth century AD.

The area had been settled in Neolithic times, as evidenced by flints and other tools excavated on the northern fringe of Portmarnock and the remains of a ring fort visible from the air at the south of the town. The son of Queen Maedhbh of Connaught – Maine – is also said to have been buried locally.

Transport
Portmarnock is on the northern commuter railway line out of Dublin (also the Dublin–Belfast line); Portmarnock railway station, opened on 25 May 1844, is now on the DART network. The village is served by Dublin Bus routes 102, 32, 32X, 42, 42N (Nitelink) and 142.

Education
There are two primary schools – St. Marnock's and St. Helen's – and also a secondary school, Portmarnock Community School.

Religion
Portmarnock has a Roman Catholic parish and church.

Sport
Portmarnock is famous for the world-class golf course at Portmarnock Golf Club, which formally opened on 26 December 1894. Occupying much of the sandy peninsula to the south of the village, the club has hosted many golf tournaments, including the 1960 Canada Cup (now known as the World Cup), the 1991 Walker Cup and the Irish Open on many occasions.  Another links course, part of the Portmarnock Hotel and Golf Links complex, that opened in the 1990s, was designed by German golfer Bernhard Langer. That golfing hotel is built around St. Marnock's, the former home of a branch of the Jameson distilling family, which had its own private golf course. St. Marnock's was largely built in the late 1890s to the designs of British architect Sir Robert Lorimer.

Naomh Mearnóg is the local Gaelic Athletic Association club.

Other local sports clubs include Portmarnock Tennis Club, Portmarnock A.F.C., AUL Premier A side Seaview Celtic F.C., and the Portmarnock Sport & Leisure Club which encompasses 16 sporting activities and holds a swimming pool with some public access hours.

Portmarnock Pitch & Putt Club was founded in 1958 and moved to its current location in 1961. It has been affiliated to the Pitch and Putt Union of Ireland since its foundation in 1961 and is currently a members-only club with over 400 adult and 100 under-16 members.

Representation
Portmarnock lies in the Dublin Fingal Dáil constituency and in the modern administrative county of Fingal. Before 2016 it was in the Dublin North-East constituency.

Notable people
Eamonn Andrews, the broadcaster, lived in Portmarnock from 1969 to his death in 1987.
Brian McFadden, musician and former Westlife singer, lived in Portmarnock until 2004, when he emigrated to the UK with his Australian then-fiancée Delta Goodrem.
 International footballer Stephen Ward grew up in Portmarnock.
Marty Whelan, radio and television personality, lived with his family in Portmarnock for twenty five years before relocating to the nearby village of Malahide.  
Ian Garry, Mixed martial artist and former Cage Warriors welterweight champion , born and grew up in Portmarnock.

See also
List of towns and villages in Ireland

References

External links

Portmarnock Community Information

visitportmarnock.ie

 
Beaches of Fingal
Towers in the Republic of Ireland